Brian Marshall (born April 1, 1965) is a Canadian retired track and field athlete, who competed in the men's high jump at the 1988 Summer Olympics.

Originally from Ottawa, Ontario, Marshall was an active athlete in high school, setting a national Canada-wide high jump record at the high school level in 1981. He subsequently attended Stanford University, where he won a Pac-10 championship in the high jump in 1988; his  jump remained the all-time record for a Stanford University athlete as of 2016.

At the 1988 Summer Olympics, he jumped , placing 17th — a tie with fellow Canadian jumper Milton Ottey and South Korean jumper Cho Hyun-Wook — and failing to qualify for the finals.

Marshall came out as gay in 1994 by attending a political gala at Rideau Hall as the guest of Svend Robinson, Canada's first openly gay Member of Parliament. He was also a panelist at the 2003 National Gay and Lesbian Athletics Conference in Cambridge, Massachusetts, on a panel of LGBT Olympians that also included swimmer Mark Tewksbury and rower Harriet Metcalf.

Achievements

References

1965 births
Olympic track and field athletes of Canada
Athletes (track and field) at the 1988 Summer Olympics
Canadian male high jumpers
Canadian LGBT sportspeople
Gay sportsmen
Athletes from Ottawa
Stanford University alumni
Living people
Canadian gay men
LGBT track and field athletes
21st-century Canadian LGBT people
Stanford Cardinal men's track and field athletes